Ryan Hicks (born 29 May 1991), best known by his stage name Ryan Tricks, is an English mind reader and magician. Ryan presents and stars in the BBC Three (online) series of Ryan Tricks On The Streets (aired November 2018) and Dirty Tricks produced by Vice Media on Channel 5 (first aired 23 January 2019).

Early life 
Ryan was born on 29 May 1991 at Wexham Park Hospital in Slough, Berkshire. Ryan first was inspired to do magic when his mum (Julie) bought him a magic kit for Christmas when he was 8 years old. At the age of 15, Ryan's mum passed away and he says that she is his main inspiration for his magic.

Career 
Ryan was first brought to the public's attention in 2013 with appearance on Britain's Got Talent where despite getting through to the next round with three 'yeses', he was then dropped before the live shows. Between 2013 and 2018 Ryan moves to the online platform of YouTube where he begins to make his own style of videos of giving back to the homeless and others in the community. This led to multiple videos then going viral including one where he turns pennies into pounds for a homeless man. This didn't go unnoticed as this is when BBC Three (online) commissioned a 6 part mini series where Ryan gives back to the community using his magic.

Works

Television series

Tricks on the Streets

Series 1

Dirty Tricks

Series 1

Media Appearances

Britain's Got Talent (series 7)
Ryan performed a controversial effect in his audition in the seventh series of Britain's Got Talent as he is seen to have Alesha Dixon play Russian roulette with a staple gun against his own head.

Link Up TV - The Showroom 
Ryan starred in the first episode of 'The Showroom', a brand new online lifestyle and entertainment program devised by Link Up TV

Social media 
RyanTricksTV is Ryan Tricks YouTube channel which has racked up over 100,000 subscribers and millions of views from self produced magic videos.

Private Appearances
Ryan has performed for multiple high-profile celebrities including world champion boxer Floyd Mayweather Jr., movie star and comedian Kevin Hart, YouTube celebrities Joe Sugg and KSI and dozens of music artists including Post Malone, Marshmello and Paloma Faith. Ryan has done private speaks with magic for large companys including Facebook and Thames Water.

Personal life 
Ryan has four brothers, Warren, Jason, Aaron and Mason as well as one sister, Courtney. Ryan also has one son named Toby and a daughter named Rosie.

References

External links

BBC Three Show - Ryan Tricks On The Streets

Living people
1991 births
English magicians